Elections to provincial and municipal people's assemblies(도 지방 인민회의 대의원 선거) were held in North Korea on November 21, 1993.

In total, 3,520 provincial and municipal people's assembly deputies were elected. Voter turnout was reported as 99.9%, with candidates receiving a 100% approval rate.

References

Local elections
North Korea
Local elections in North Korea
North Korean local elections